James Patrick Rigby is an American politician serving as a Republican member of the Pennsylvania House of Representatives for the 71st district since 2019.

Biography
Rigby graduated from Ferndale Area High School and attended the police academy at the Greater Johnstown Career and Technology Center. After volunteering as a firefighter, he worked as a police officer and was named chief of police in Ferndale in 2015. He also served on the Ferndale Borough Council for 24 years, including 6 years as the council president.

In 2018, Rigby was elected to the Pennsylvania House of Representatives representing the 71st district, which includes parts of Cambria County and Somerset County. He defeated incumbent Democratic representative Bryan Barbin in the general election with 52% of the vote. He ran for reelection and 2020 and did not have an opponent in the general election.

Rigby currently sits on the Government Oversight, Judiciary, Liquor Control, Local Government, Subcommittee on Boroughs committees, and Veterans Affairs & Emergency Preparedness

He has three children with his wife Kathleen.

References

External links
Pennsylvania House of Representatives profile
Campaign website

Living people
Year of birth missing (living people)
Republican Party members of the Pennsylvania House of Representatives
21st-century American politicians